George Thomas Russell Jessiman (24 September 1900 – 1986) was a Scottish amateur football outside left who made 120 appearances in the Scottish League for Arthurlie. He also played for Clyde, Morton, Albion Rovers and Alloa Athletic and was capped by Scotland at amateur level.

Career statistics

Honours 
Arthurlie

 Scottish League Third Division: 1923–24

References 

1900 births
1986 deaths
Scottish footballers
Scottish Football League players
Arthurlie F.C. players
Scotland amateur international footballers
Date of death missing
Footballers from Glasgow
Greenock Morton F.C. players
Clyde F.C. players
Albion Rovers F.C. players
Alloa Athletic F.C. players
Association football outside forwards
People from Gorbals